Slavic diaspora may refer to any of the following diasporas of Slavs:

Belarusian diaspora
Bosnian diaspora and Bosniak diaspora
Bulgarian diaspora
Croatian diaspora
Czech diaspora
Macedonian diaspora
Polish diaspora
Russian diaspora
Serbian diaspora and Serb diaspora
Ukrainian diaspora

European diasporas